Gerrhosaurus is a genus of lizards native to southern and eastern Africa.

Habitat
Species of Gerrhosaurus are found in dry, rocky semi-open habitats.

Species and subspecies
The following species and subspecies are recognized as being valid. Some have been reassigned to new genera.

Gerrhosaurus auritus  – Kalahari plated lizard
Gerrhosaurus bulsi 
Gerrhosaurus flavigularis  – yellow-throated plated lizard
Gerrhosaurus flavigularis fitzsimonsi  
Gerrhosaurus flavigularis flavigularis 
Gerrhosaurus multilineatus 
Gerrhosaurus nigrolineatus  – black-lined plated lizard
Gerrhosaurus nigrolineatus ahlefeldti 
 Gerrhosaurus nigrolineatus nigrolineatus 
Gerrhosaurus skoogi  – desert plated lizard 
Gerrhosaurus typicus  – Namaqua plated lizard

References

Further reading
Bates MF, Tolley KA, Edwards S, Davids Z, Da Silva JM, Branch WR (2013). "A molecular phylogeny of the African plated lizards, genus Gerrhosaurus Wiegmann, 1828 (Squamata: Gerrhosauridae), with the description of two new genera". Zootaxa 3750 (5): 465–493. (Broadleysaurus and Matobosaurus, new genera).
Branch, Bill (2004). Field Guide to Snakes and other Reptiles of Southern Africa. Third Revised edition, Second impression. Sanibel Island, Florida: Ralph Curtis Books. 399 pp. . (Genus Gerrhosaurus, p. 178).
Wiegmann AF (1828). "Beiträge zur Amphibienkunde ". Isis von Oken 21 (4): 364–383. (Gerrhosaurus, new genus, p. 375). (in German).

 
Gerrhosauridae
Lizards of Africa
Lizard genera
Taxa named by Arend Friedrich August Wiegmann